= Znaimer Volksstimme =

German language socialist newspaper

Znaimer Volksstimme ('People's Voice of Znaim') was a German language socialist newspaper published from Znojmo (German: Znaim) in Moravia, Austria-Hungary (today in the Czech Republic). It was published weekly and publishing began in 1913. It carried the byline 'Organ of the working people of the Znojmo Electoral District' (Organ des arbeitenden Volkes des Znaimer Wahlkreises). The publisher of Znaimer Volksstimme was Wilhem Niessner from Brno. Publication ended in late 1918 or early 1919. After Znaimer Volksstimme was closed down it was replaced by the weekly newspaper Volkswille, published from Brno.
